The Robbie Williams Show is a live DVD and VHS video by Robbie Williams, recorded in 2002 in Pinewood Studios before the release of the album Escapology. Many of the album's songs were performed for the first time here, with Robbie jokingly declaring to some fans that they may have already heard some of the new songs (such as "Something Beautiful"), but only through unauthorized Internet leaks.

Track listing 
"Trouble"/"Handsome Man" (from Escapology)
"Rock DJ" (from Sing When You're Winning)
"Strong" (from I've Been Expecting You)
"Something Beautiful" (from Escapology)
"Feel" (from Escapology)
"Have You Met Miss Jones?" (from Swing When You're Winning)
"Mr. Bojangles" (from Swing When You're Winning)
"One for My Baby (and One More for the Road)" (from Swing When You're Winning)
"Ain't That a Kick in the Head?" (from Swing When You're Winning)
"Monsoon" (from Escapology)
"Hot Fudge" (from Escapology)
"No Regrets" (from I've Been Expecting You)
"Nan's Song" (from Escapology)
"Me and My Monkey" (from Escapology)
"One Fine Day" (from Come Undone)
"Come Undone" (from Escapology)
"Angels" (from Life thru a Lens)

The songs "Nan's Song" and "One Fine Day" both feature Robbie Williams on acoustic guitar.

The show's opening number, "Trouble"/"Handsome Man", is identical in concept and staging to the  opening sequence of Elvis Presley's '68 Comeback Special, down to the same opening song ("Trouble") with the same arrangement. The only differences are the huge RW logo with arrows in red lights (replacing the ELVIS one), and female dancers on the jail cell back-drop holding microphones, instead of male ones holding guitars.  The stage sets in the show are also similar to the ones used in the live concert segments of Presley's TV special.

Extras 
Extra songs from the show:
"How Peculiar"
"Feel"
"Sexed Up"
"Revolution"
What a performance: behind the scenes documentary
Photo gallery
Lights game (Easter egg: "Sweet Home Alabama")
Credits

Certifications

References 

Robbie Williams video albums